WrestleMania XL is the upcoming 40th annual WrestleMania professional wrestling pay-per-view and livestreaming event produced by WWE. It will be held for wrestlers from the promotion's Raw and SmackDown brand divisions. The event is scheduled to be held as a two-night event, taking place on April 6 and 7, 2024, at Lincoln Financial Field in Philadelphia, Pennsylvania. It will be the second WrestleMania to be held in the city of Philadelphia, after WrestleMania XV in 1999, and the first WrestleMania since WrestleMania XXX in 2014 to incorporate Roman numerals in its title.

Production

Background 

WrestleMania is WWE's flagship pay-per-view (PPV) and livestreaming event, having first been held in 1985. It was the company's first PPV produced and was also the company's first major event available via livestreaming when WWE began using that broadcasting outlet in 2014. It is the longest-running professional wrestling event in history and is held annually between mid-March to mid-April. Along with Royal Rumble, SummerSlam, Survivor Series, and Money in the Bank, it is one of the company's five biggest events of the year, referred to as the "Big Five". WrestleMania is ranked the sixth-most valuable sports brand in the world by Forbes, and has been described as the Super Bowl of sports entertainment. Much like the Super Bowl, cities bid for the right to host the year's edition of WrestleMania. WrestleMania XL will feature wrestlers from the Raw and SmackDown brand divisions. In addition to airing on traditional PPV, it will be available to livestream on Peacock in the United States and the WWE Network in international markets.

On July 27, 2022, it was announced that Lincoln Financial Field in Philadelphia, Pennsylvania would host WrestleMania 40 on April 6 and 7, 2024. The logo was revealed on October 8, 2022, during the Extreme Rules Kickoff pre-show at the nearby Wells Fargo Center. Themed after the Liberty Bell and in the colors of the Philadelphia Eagles, it incorporates Roman numerals for the first time since WrestleMania XXX in 2014, thus officially stylizing the title as WrestleMania XL.

Storylines 
The event will include matches that each result from scripted storylines, where wrestlers portray heroes, villains, or less distinguishable characters in scripted events that build tension and culminate in a wrestling match or series of matches. Results are predetermined by WWE's writers on the Raw and SmackDown brands, while storylines are produced on WWE's weekly television shows, Monday Night Raw and Friday Night SmackDown.

References

External links 
 

2024 in Pennsylvania
Events in Philadelphia
WrestleMania
Scheduled professional wrestling shows
Professional wrestling in Pennsylvania
Sports competitions in Philadelphia